The 1913 Philadelphia Athletics season involved the A's finishing first in the American League with a record of 96 wins and 57 losses. The team then defeated the New York Giants in the 1913 World Series, 4 games to 1.
In 2001, baseball historian Bill James ranked the 1913 incarnation of the Athletics' famous "$100,000 infield" as the best of all time in major league history (first baseman Stuffy McInnis, second baseman Eddie Collins, third baseman Frank "Home Run" Baker, and shortstop Jack Barry).

Regular season

Season standings

Record vs. opponents

Roster

Player stats

Batting

Starters by position
Note: Pos = Position; G = Games played; AB = At bats; H = Hits; Avg. = Batting average; HR = Home runs; RBI = Runs batted in

Other batters
Note: G = Games played; AB = At bats; H = Hits; Avg. = Batting average; HR = Home runs; RBI = Runs batted in

Pitching

Starting pitchers
Note: G = Games pitched; IP = Innings pitched; W = Wins; L = Losses; ERA = Earned run average; SO = Strikeouts

Other pitchers
Note: G = Games pitched; IP = Innings pitched; W = Wins; L = Losses; ERA = Earned run average; SO = Strikeouts

Relief pitchers
Note: G = Games pitched; W = Wins; L = Losses; SV = Saves; ERA = Earned run average; SO = Strikeouts

1913 World Series 

AL Philadelphia Athletics (4) vs. NL New York Giants (1)

References

External links
1913 Philadelphia Athletics team page at Baseball Reference
1913 Philadelphia Athletics team page at www.baseball-almanac.com

Oakland Athletics seasons
Philadelphia Athletics season
American League champion seasons
World Series champion seasons
Oakland